58 was an American rock band, a side project involving Nikki Sixx of Mötley Crüe and producer Dave Darling, Sixx's former father-in-law.  The band name originates from the fact that both Sixx and Darling were born in 1958.  The band also included Steve Gibb (son of Bee Gees's Barry Gibb) on guitar and Bucket Baker on drums.
The band described themselves as a mixture of "glam, hip hop, rock, pop, funk and a car crash."
  
They released one album, Diet for a New America, in June 2000 on Americoma Records, an imprint of Beyond Music.

The original Demo for "1958" was recorded in 1996. The demo was Produced by Scott Humphrey and assistant engineer Brian VanPortfleet. The entire 7 track demo was recorded and mixed in two weeks.

Members 
Steve Gibb - guitar
Nikki Sixx - bass guitar
Bucket Baker - drums
Dave Darling - guitar, vocals, producer

Discography
 Diet for a New America - 2000

Sources

Rock music groups from California